You Might Be a Redneck If… is an album by American comedian Jeff Foxworthy. It was released by Warner Bros. Records on June 15, 1993. The album peaked at number 38 on the Billboard 200 chart and has been certified 3× Platinum by the RIAA. The album was recorded at the Majestic Theatre in Dallas, Texas.

As of 2014, sales in the United States have exceeded 2,055,000 copies, according to Nielsen SoundScan.

Track listing
All tracks written by Jeff Foxworthy.
"Introduction" – 0:33
"Words in the South" – 2:15
"You Might Be a Redneck If…" – 2:43
"Life as a Father" – 9:41
"Single Life Is Just Too Hard" – 12:12
"I Love Being Married" – 16:46
"You Might Be a Redneck If…, Pt. 2" – 2:21

Note: On the cassette version, "Single Life Is Just Too Hard" is split between Sides A and B.

Personnel
Compiled from liner notes.
 David Boyd – cover art
 Jeff Foxworthy – executive production
 Doug Grau – editing
 Ronnie Thomas – editing
 Hank Williams – mastering

Charts

Weekly charts

Year-end charts

References

1993 debut albums
Jeff Foxworthy albums
Warner Records albums
1990s comedy albums